Hua was a vassal state of the Zhou dynasty in modern Yanshi, Henan Province. It was destroyed by the State of Qin in 627 BC.

The ruins of Hua are located in Huachenghe Village, Yanshi. It is now a Major National Historical and Cultural Site.

References

Ancient Chinese states
History of Henan